Cecil Phillip Clarke (born April 12, 1968) is a politician in Nova Scotia, Canada. He was the mayor of the Cape Breton Regional Municipality from 2012 to 2020, and represented the riding of Cape Breton North in the Nova Scotia House of Assembly, from 2001 to 2011 as a Progressive Conservative.

Before politics
Born in North Sydney, Nova Scotia, Clarke graduated with a bachelor's degree from Mount Allison University in 1990.

Political career
In the 1997 federal election, Clarke made his first attempt at entering politics, running as the Progressive Conservative candidate in Sydney—Victoria. He finished third behind New Democrat Peter Mancini, and Liberal Vince MacLean.
Clarke turned to provincial politics and was elected in a March 2001 byelection. He was re-elected in the 2003, 2006 and 2009 general elections. He served in the Executive Council of Nova Scotia as Minister of Economic Development, Minister of Energy, Attorney General and Minister of Justice as well as Provincial Secretary. Clarke was Speaker of the House of Assembly of Nova Scotia from June 2006 to October 2007.

In July 2010, Clarke announced that he was seeking the federal Conservative nomination for the riding of Sydney—Victoria. On March 25, 2011, Clarke resigned his seat in the Nova Scotia legislature so he could run for the Conservatives in the 2011 federal election. On May 2, 2011, Clarke was defeated in his bid for a seat in the House of Commons of Canada by Liberal incumbent Mark Eyking.

On September 6, 2012, Clarke announced that he was entering the race for mayor of the Cape Breton Regional Municipality in the 2012 Nova Scotia municipal elections. On October 20, 2012, Clarke was elected mayor. He assumed office on November 5, 2012.

Clarke was re-elected mayor in the 2016 municipal election.

Clarke was criticized in early 2018 for a trip to China which cost taxpayers over $30,000 and included first-class tickets for himself.

In 2018, Clarke came out as gay, revealing that someone had threatened to out him.

On February 3, 2018, Clarke announced his candidacy for the leadership of the Progressive Conservative Party of Nova Scotia. He lost to Tim Houston.

Electoral record

References

External links
 Cecil Clarke on CBRM website.

1968 births
Living people
Members of the United Church of Canada
Progressive Conservative Association of Nova Scotia MLAs
Speakers of the Nova Scotia House of Assembly
Members of the Executive Council of Nova Scotia
Conservative Party of Canada candidates for the Canadian House of Commons
Mount Allison University alumni
Mayors of Cape Breton Regional Municipality
Nova Scotia candidates for Member of Parliament
People from North Sydney, Nova Scotia
Attorneys General of Nova Scotia
LGBT mayors of places in Canada
Canadian LGBT people in provincial and territorial legislatures
Gay politicians
21st-century Canadian LGBT people
Canadian gay men